Sør-Fron is a municipality in Innlandet county, Norway. It is located in the traditional district of Gudbrandsdal. The administrative centre of the municipality is the village of Hundorp. Other villages in the municipality include Gålå, Harpefoss, and Lia.

The  municipality is the 153rd largest by area out of the 356 municipalities in Norway. Sør-Fron is the 224th most populous municipality in Norway with a population of 3,064.

General information
The prestegjeld of Fron was established as a civil municipality on 1 January 1838 when the new formannskapsdistrikt law went into effect. On 1 January 1851, the municipality was divided in two. The northwest portion became Nord-Fron Municipality (population: 4,685) and the southeast portion became Sør-Fron Municipality (population: 3,421). On 27 July 1956, a small area of Sør-Fron municipality (population: 7) was transferred to the neighboring municipality of Vestre Gausdal.

During the 1960s, there were many municipal mergers across Norway due to the work of the Schei Committee. On 1 January 1966, the municipalities of Nord-Fron (population: 5,758) and Sør-Fron (population: 3,648) were merged to form a new Fron Municipality (with similar borders to the old Fron municipality that existed from 1838-1851 minus the Sjoa area had switched from Nord-Fron to Sel).

This merger was not well-liked among the residents of the new municipality. On 1 January 1977, the merger was reversed and Nord-Fron (population: 6,131) and Sør-Fron (population: 3,509) were recreated using their old borders from 1965.

Name
The municipality (and the prestegjeld) of Fron was named after the old Fron farm ( since this was the site of the first Fron Church. The meaning of the name is unknown (maybe "earth" or "land"). The prefix of the name, Sør- means "south", hence the name of the municipality is "(the) southern (part of) Fron" (since the parish of Fron was divided in 1851 into a "north" and a "south" part). During the 19th century, it was called Søndre Fron, using another word which also means "south".

Coat of arms
The coat of arms was granted on 4 March 1988. The arms show a white or silver club on a green background. The club is reminiscent of the club that Kolbein Sterke used in the year 1021 when King Olav Haraldsson met the people of Fron and Dale-Gudbrand at Hundorp. This meeting is in a book by Snorre Sturlusson. "Look, our god is coming with a lot of light," said King Olav. Dale-Gudbrand and the farmers looked at the sun that was just rising. Kolbein then took the club and smashed to pieces the statue of the god Thor standing at Hundorp. After this, the people of the area were Christians, according to Snorre.

Churches
The Church of Norway has one parish within the municipality of Sør-Fron. It is part of the Sør-Gudbrandsdal prosti (deanery) in the Diocese of Hamar.

Government
All municipalities in Norway, including Sør-Fron, are responsible for primary education (through 10th grade), outpatient health services, senior citizen services, unemployment and other social services, zoning, economic development, and municipal roads.  The municipality is governed by a municipal council of elected representatives, which in turn elects a mayor.  The municipality falls under the Vestre Innlandet District Court and the Eidsivating Court of Appeal.

Municipal council
The municipal council  of Sør-Fron is made up of 19 representatives that are elected to four year terms.  The party breakdown of the council is as follows:

Mayors
The mayors of Sør-Fron (incomplete list):
1977-1982: Jon Tofte (Ap)
1983-1991: Arne Hernæs (Ap)
1992-1997: Torstein Rudihagen (Ap)
1997-1999: Willy Heimstad (Ap)
1999-2011: Aksel Eng (Ap)
2011-2011: Laila Nyhus Toppen (Ap)
2011–present: Ole Tvete Muriteigen (Sp)

Geography

Sør-Fron municipality is bordered to the west by Nord-Fron municipality, to the southwest by Øystre Slidre municipality, to the south by Gausdal municipality, to the east by Ringebu and Stor-Elvdal municipalities, and to the north by Folldal municipality. The river Gudbrandsdalslågen runs through the central part of the municipality.

The lakes Atnsjøen, Olstappen, and Sandvatnet/Kaldfjorden/Øyvatnet are located in the municipality. The municipality includes parts of the Gudbrandsdalen and Espedalen valleys.

Rondane National Park

Rondane National Park, which lies partially in Sør-Fron, was the first Norwegian National Park, established in 1962. In 2003, Rondane National Park was enlarged and smaller areas of nature protection were opened or enlarged adjacent to the park.

Culture
The famous play Peer Gynt is staged annually at Lake Gålå in a mountainous region of Sør-Fron as part of a festival. The play itself is supposed to have been set in a Norwegian location such as Gålå.

Notable residents
 Dale-Gudbrand (1100s) an historical Norwegian Hersir, lived at a farm in Hundorp
 Ludvig Holberg, Baron of Holberg (1684–1754) a writer, philosopher, historian and playwright, brought up in Sør-Fron
 Andreas Brandrud (1868 in Sør-Fron – 1957) a Norwegian professor, theologian and church historian
 Oddvar Nygaard (1919 in Hundorp – 1985) a Norwegian accordionist and composer

References

External links

Municipal fact sheet from Statistics Norway 

 
Municipalities of Innlandet
1851 establishments in Norway
1966 disestablishments in Norway
1977 establishments in Norway